Johnny Edward Morris (born September 26, 1935) is an American former professional football player who was a halfback and wide receiver for the Chicago Bears in the National Football League (NFL).  He spent his entire ten-year career with the Bears, and is the franchise's all-time leader in receiving yards with 5,059.  He attended the University of California, Santa Barbara. Morris won an NFL championship in 1963. In 1964, he had his best season with 93 receptions for 1,200 yards and 10 touchdowns.

In 1964, while still playing for the Bears, Morris joined WBBM-TV in Chicago as a sportscaster. Except for a six-year stint at rival WMAQ-TV, Morris remained at WBBM until 1992, serving for most of that time as sports director. He became good friends with film critic Gene Siskel when Siskel was hired by the station in the 1970s. During his time at WBBM-TV, he popularised the use of the telestrator (a device for drawing over still or moving video images) in sports television, which was invented by fellow WBBM-TV employee Leonard Reiffel for his science-related TV series Dimensions on Tomorrow's Living and The World Tomorrow. He also served as a football color commentator for CBS' NFL coverage from 1975 to 1986. He retired in 1996.

His father was from Achladokampos, Greece (family name Μονοπορης, or Monoporis), while his mother was Swedish. While playing for the Bears, Morris was known as "Little Greek" and teammate Bill George was "Big Greek".

Morris was married to sports reporter Jeannie Morris, whom he met at UC Santa Barbara, from 1960 to 1985. The two remained close after their divorce as television colleagues. Jeannie died December 14, 2020.

References

1935 births
Living people
American football running backs
American football wide receivers
Chicago Bears players
UC Santa Barbara Gauchos football players
Western Conference Pro Bowl players
National Football League announcers
Sportspeople from Long Beach, California
Players of American football from Long Beach, California
American football announcers
Long Beach Polytechnic High School alumni